Easton is a surname. Notable people with the surname include: 

Adam Easton, English cardinal in the 14th century
Amos Easton (1905–1968), better known as Bumble Bee Slim, American blues musician
 Alex Easton (born 1969), Northern Irish politician
 Brian Easton (economist) (born 1943), New Zealand economist
 Brian Easton (footballer) (born 1988), Scottish footballer
Carla J. Easton, Scottish singer-songwriter
Clint Easton, English professional footballer
Cornelis Easton (1864–1929), Dutch journalist and astronomer
David Easton (1917–2014), Canadian-born American political scientist
Douglas Easton, British epidemiologist
Dossie Easton, American family therapist
Elliot Easton, American guitarist for The Cars
Florence Easton (1882–1955), English dramatic soprano
Florence Easton (1890s soprano), English soprano of the early 1890s
George W. Easton, Scottish businessman, footballer and sportsperson
Jack Easton (Royal Navy officer), Royal Naval Volunteer Reserve, winner of the George Cross
John Easton (disambiguation), several people
Ken Easton (1924–2001), English doctor
Mark Easton, BBC News Home Editor
Matthew George Easton, Scottish Presbyterian preacher and writer
Matt Easton, director of the British historical European martial arts organization, Schola Gladiatoria
Michael Easton, American television actor
Nicholas Easton, colonial governor of Rhode Island
Peter Easton, Canadian pirate
Robert Easton (disambiguation), several people
Roger L. Easton, inventor of GPS
Sam Easton, Canadian actor
Sheena Easton, Scottish pop singer and songwriter
Sidney Easton, American actor, stage performer, playwright, composer, vocalist, and pianist.
Tim Easton, American guitarist
William Easton (disambiguation), several people